Palestinian people or Palestinians are an ethnonational group descended from peoples who have lived in Palestine.

Palestinian may also refer to:

Groups of people
 Definitions of Palestinian, listing several definitions
 Palestinian diaspora, Palestinian people living outside the region of Palestine
 Palestinian refugees, citizens of Mandatory Palestine, and their descendants
 Arab citizens of Israel, many of whom self-identify as Palestinian

Places
State of Palestine, a de jure sovereign state in the Western Asia
Palestinian territories, the West Bank including East Jerusalem and the Gaza Strip
Palestine (region), a geographic region in Western Asia
Mandatory Palestine, a geoplotical entity 1920–1948

Other uses
 Palestinian (horse), a racehorse
 Palestinian cuisine
 The Palestinian, a 1977 television documentary

See also

 Palestine (disambiguation)
 Definitions of Palestinian
 Demographics of Palestine
 List of Palestinians
All-Palestine Government, the administration in Gaza from 1948 - 1959
Palestinian Central Council, a policy decision arm of the Palestinian Liberation Organization (PLO)
Palestine Liberation Organization (PLO), an organization founded in 1964 to liberate Palestine
Palestinian National Authority, an interim self-government body administering the Gaza strip from 1994 - 2013
Palestine National Council, the legislative body of the PLO
PLO Executive Committee, the highest executive body of the PLO